Nora Frances Henderson Secondary School (NFHSS) is located at 1770 Upper Sherman Avenue in Hamilton, Ontario, Canada and is a part of the Hamilton-Wentworth District School Board.  Originally opened in 1961 as Barton Secondary School, and originally located on 75 Palmer Rd., it had a September 2008 enrolment of 955, and had 28 primary languages spoken within the school by students aside from English.   The school's mission statement is "Educating students to become lifelong learners and contributing citizens in a challenging, changing, multi-cultural world."  Students are required by Provincial Law to complete 30 mandatory credits and the Ontario Secondary School Literacy Test (OSSLT) within their secondary school career. The school also offers special education classes as well as an ESL program. The HWDSB announced on May 24, 2012, that Barton Secondary School would be closed, along with Hill Park Secondary School and Mountain Secondary School with the students to be consolidated into a new, $25 million school. The school was renamed Nora Frances Henderson Secondary School in September 2014, in honour of Nora-Frances Henderson, the first woman to be elected to political office in Hamilton. The original building remained in service until the new Nora Frances Henderson Secondary School was opened on October 14, 2020. In July 2018, the Hamilton-Wentworth District School Board got approval on building the new Nora Frances Henderson Secondary School. The school was designed by CS&P Architects and was built by Tambro Construction. The original building is now currently being used as Sherwood Secondary School, as of September 2022, when the school was temporarily moved from its location on 25 High St to conduct renovations due to asbestos concerns.

History

BSS was founded on November 11, 1961, as part of the Board of Education for the City of Hamilton's plan to have enough schools available for children of baby boomers. In 1972, the school became Hamilton's pilot school in initiating a semester system that had been showing positive increases in student achievement amongst schools in Alberta and British Columbia. Over a four-year period, results were studied and in 1976, the semester system was deemed a success and adapted by other schools in Hamilton and the surrounding area.

The school has evolved into a modern composite high school that offers a variety of academics, athletics and co-curricular activities. The school has five computer labs, a renovated gymnasium and library, a full menu cafeteria, state-of-the-art communication labs and technological shops. A Specialist High Skills Major in Manufacturing is offered at Barton.  In the program, students receive training in Fall Protection, Workplace Hazardous Materials Information System, CPR, First Aid and a Canadian Welding Bureau (CWB) certification because Barton is a CWB testing facility.  B.S.S. has over 150 courses, though not all are offered at any given time.

School specialization
BSS takes part in the Hamilton-Wentworth District School Board's Programs of Choice method that tailors learning to specific areas of interest. Barton Secondary School's focus is on the manufacturing industry and offers programs accordingly. Grade 9 and 10 students in the program are offered introductory courses in the manufacturing field, while grade 11 and 12 students have the option to specialize in the program. Barton Secondary School also provides a Cisco networking course through the Cisco Networking Academy. This program is taught largely through the use of online material (with the exception of students creating an Ethernet Cable) as the school does not have the required equipment to provide students so that they may do the lab portion of the course.

Program highlights and student support programs
Barton Secondary School takes part in the following programs:
 Monthly Case Conferences to focus on students at risk
 After-school Literacy & Numeracy program
 Math Work Room – to complete homework or assignments
 BEST Program - On-site Alter Ed. program for senior students
 High School Prep Course and Transition Program for Gr. 9 students
 Pathways program for all career destinations
 Cooperative Education/Work Experience for Students at Risk
 Ontario Secondary School Literacy Course
 Credit Recovery Programs
 Leadership and Peer Support course
 Locally Developed Courses
 Student Success Learning Teams
 Meetings with Feeder schools
 Development of Staff
 One on One meetings with Students at Risk (STAR) and communication with Parents
 Peer Mentorship Program between seniors and new gr. 9 students.
 Data Team meetings – Workshops for STAR – Study Skills, Organizational Skills, Test taking
 CISCO – Computer Networking certification programs
 Canadian Welding Bureau certification (CWB Testing Facility
 Award-winning - Manufacturing - Profiling Excellence Educator Award
 Photography
 Basketball Academy

Field trips
Barton offers a few school trips each year. These are dependent largely on which class you take and which club you are partaking in and can be broken down as follows:
Zoo Trip - For 9th grade geography students only.
Band Trips - For Band members only. Trips are to various locations to perform against bands from other schools.
English Field Trip to Stratford - Open to all students
Field Trip to One of Five Locations (Europe, New York, Boston, Washington, Ottawa) - 11th and 12th grade students only, with a different destination each year

Extracurricular activities
Barton has extracurricular activities that are largely the same as neighbouring schools. These include:
Sports (Basketball, Soccer, Hockey, Badminton, Swimming, Football and Girls Field Hockey)
Year Book Committee
Band

Notable alumni
 Bryan Crawford (born 1982), former Canadian football running back & special teams captain for the Toronto Argonauts.

See also
List of high schools in Ontario

References

External links
Profile at the Education Quality and Accountability Office (EQAO) web site

High schools in Hamilton, Ontario
Educational institutions established in 1961
1961 establishments in Ontario